Hypsotropa niveicosta is a species of snout moth in the genus Hypsotropa. It was described by George Hampson in 1918 and is known from Argentina.

References

Moths described in 1918
Taxa named by George Hampson
Anerastiini